Hormel, a surname, may refer to:

People with the name
George A. Hormel, founder of Hormel Foods
George "Gordie" Hormel, son of Jay
James Hormel, U.S. Ambassador and heir to the Hormel Foods fortune
Jay Catherwood Hormel, son of George A.

Brands and enterprises
Hormel Corporation, a New York-based creator of coffee carafes and similar products
Hormel Foods Corporation, an Austin, MN-based food company founded by George A. Hormel